The women's 4x100 metres relay event at the 2015 European Athletics U23 Championships was held in Tallinn, Estonia, at Kadriorg Stadium on 12 July.

Medalists

Results

Final
12 July

Heats
12 July

Heat 1

Heat 2

Participation
According to an unofficial count, 50 athletes from 12 countries participated in the event.

References

4 x 100 metres relay
Relays at the European Athletics U23 Championships